Gold extraction refers to the processes required to extract gold from its ores. The great majority of gold is extracted from dilute ores using a combination of chemical processes.  About 2000 tons are obtained from the earth annually, plus another 300 tons from recycling.

Types of ore

Gold occurs principally as a native metal, i.e., gold itself. Sometimes it is alloyed to a greater or lesser extent with silver, which is called electrum. Native gold can occur as sizeable nuggets, as fine grains or flakes in alluvial deposits, or as grains or microscopic particles (known as colour) embedded in rock minerals.  Other forms of gold are the minerals calaverite (AuTe), aurostibnite (AuSb2), and maldonite (Au2Bi).  These latter three, although rarer that native gold, can be slow to react with cyanide and thus difficult to process. Still other gold-containing ores include various tellurides (sylvanite, nagyagite, petzite, and krennerite).

Certain contaminants in ores can interfere with the extractability of gold by cyanide.  These interfering agents are called "preg-robbing ores".  For example, gold can bind tightly to carbon, resisting normal cyanide extraction.  Gold cyanides bind also to some clays.

Concentration

While the romantic picture of gold mining focuses on nuggets, the reality is that gold is typically recovered from ores containing >10 ppm of the metal.  Thus, the main challenge is concentrating this trace amount.

Cyanidation (and thiosulfate)
The principal technology involves the leaching of gold from the ore by treatment with a solution of cyanide.  Thus, the typical first step is comminution to expose the gold to the extracting solution. The extraction is conducted by dump leaching or heap leaching processes.  Sodium cyanide is produced on a billion-ton/year scale mainly for this purpose.  "Black cyanide", a carbon-contaminated form of calcium cyanide (Ca(CN)2) is often used because it is cheap.  The crude ore is washed with a c. 0.3% solution of cyanide in air, often repeatedly, and the aqueous extract is collected and refined further. The extraction is called cyanidation or the cyanide process. Recovery from solution typically involves adsorption on activated carbon, the carbon in pulp process.

Thiosulfate leaching has been proven to be effective on ores with high soluble copper values or ores which experience preg-robbing.

Leaching through bulk leach extractable gold, or BLEG, is also a process that is used to test an area for gold concentrations where gold may not be immediately visible.

Traditional methods
Gold mining from alluvium ores was once achieved by techniques associated with placer mining such as simple gold panning and sluicing, resulting in direct recovery of small gold nuggets and flakes. Placer mining techniques since the mid to late 20th century have generally only been the practice of artisan miners. Hydraulic mining was used widely in the Californian gold rush, and involved breaking down alluvial deposits with high-pressure jets of water.  Hard rock ores have formed the basis of the majority of commercial gold recovery operations since the middle of the 20th century where open pit and or sub-surface mining techniques are used.

Gravity concentration has been historically the most important way of extracting the native metal using pans or washing tables. Amalgamation with mercury was used to enhance recovery, often by adding it directly to the riffle tables, and mercury is still widely used in small diggings across the world.

Refractory gold processes

A "refractory" gold ore is an ore that has ultra-fine gold particles disseminated throughout its gold occluded minerals. These ores are naturally resistant to recovery by standard cyanidation and carbon adsorption processes.  These refractory ores require pre-treatment in order for cyanidation to be effective in recovery of the gold.  A refractory ore generally contains sulphide minerals, organic carbon, or both.  Sulphide minerals are impermeable minerals that occlude gold particles, making it difficult for the leach solution to form a complex with the gold.  Organic carbon present in gold ore may adsorb dissolved gold-cyanide complexes in much the same way as activated carbon.  This so-called "preg-robbing" carbon is washed away because it is significantly finer than the carbon recovery screens typically used to recover activated carbon.

Pre-treatment options for refractory ores include:
 Roasting
 Bio-oxidation, such as bacterial oxidation
 Pressure oxidation
 Albion process

The refractory ore treatment processes may be preceded by concentration (usually sulphide flotation).  Roasting is used to oxidize both the sulphur and organic carbon at high temperatures using air and/or oxygen.  Bio-oxidation involves the use of bacteria that promote oxidation reactions in an aqueous environment.  Pressure oxidation is an aqueous process for sulphur removal carried out in a continuous autoclave, operating at high pressures and somewhat elevated temperatures.  The Albion process utilises a combination of ultrafine grinding and atmospheric, auto-thermal, oxidative leaching.

Gold refining and parting

Parting is a process by which gold is purified to a commercially-tradeable standard, typically ≥99.5%.  Removal of silver is of particular interest since the two metals often co-purify. The standard procedure is based on the Miller process. The separation is achieved by passing chlorine gas into a molten alloy. The technique is practiced on a large scale (e.g. 500 kg).  The principle of the method exploits the nobility of gold, such that at high temperatures, gold does not react with chlorine, but virtually all contaminating metals do.  Thus, at c. 500 °C, as the chlorine gas is passed through molten mixture (again, mainly gold), a low-density slag forms on top, which can be decanted from the liquid gold. Silver chloride and other precious metals can be recovered from this slag.  The slag layer is often diluted with a flux like borax to facilitate the separation.  

Alternative methods exist for parting gold.  Silver can be dissolved selectively by boiling the mixture with 30% nitric acid, a process sometimes called inquartation. Affination is a largely obsolete process of removing silver from gold using concentrated sulfuric acid.  Electrolysis using the Wohlwill process is yet another approach.

History

The smelting of gold began sometime around 6000 – 3000 BC. According to one source the technique began to be in use in Mesopotamia or Syria. In ancient Greece, Heraclitus wrote on the subject.

According to de Lecerda and Salomons (1997) mercury was first in use for extraction at about 1000 BC, according to Meech and others (1998), mercury was used in obtaining gold until the latter period of the first millennia.

A technique known to Pliny the Elder was extraction by way of crushing, washing, and then applying heat, with the resultant material powdered.

Industrial era
Like all metals, gold is insoluble in a water.  Gold does however exhibit the distinctive properties that in the presence of cyanide ions, it dissolves in the presence of oxygen (or air). This transformation was reported in 1783 by Carl Wilhelm Scheele, but it was not until the late 19th century, that the reactions were exploited commercially. The expansion of gold mining in the Rand of South Africa began to slow down in the 1880s, as the new deposits being found tended to be pyritic ore. The gold was difficult to extract from such ores.

In 1887, John Stewart MacArthur, working in collaboration with brothers Dr Robert and Dr William Forrest for the Tennant Company in Glasgow, Scotland, developed the MacArthur-Forrest Process for the extraction of gold ores. By suspending the crushed ore in a cyanide solution, up to 96 percent gold was extracted.

The process was first used on a large scale at the Witwatersrand in 1890, leading to a boom of investment as larger gold mines were opened up. In 1896, Bodländer confirmed that oxygen was necessary for the process, something that had been doubted by MacArthur, and discovered that hydrogen peroxide was formed as an intermediate.

The method known as heap leaching was first proposed in 1969 by the United States Bureau of Mines, and was in use by the 1970s.

See also
 Bulk leach extractable gold
 Digger gold
 Gold mining
 Ore genesis

References

Gold
Metallurgical processes

de:Gold#Gewinnung